The 1937–38 Scottish Cup was the 60th staging of Scotland's most prestigious football knockout competition. The Cup was won by East Fife who defeated Kilmarnock in the replayed final.

Fourth round

Semi-finals

Replay

Second replay

Final

Replay

See also 
 1937–38 in Scottish football

Scottish Cup seasons
Scot
Cup